Sisurcana is a genus of moths belonging to the subfamily Tortricinae of the family Tortricidae.

Species
Sisurcana alticolana Razowski & Pelz, 2007
Sisurcana aluminias (Meyrick, 1912)
Sisurcana analogana Razowski & Pelz, 2007
Sisurcana antisanae Razowski & Pelz, 2007
Sisurcana atricaput Razowski & Becker, 2011
Sisurcana atterimima Razowski & Pelz, 2004
Sisurcana batalloana Razowski & Wojtusiak, 2006
Sisurcana bifurcana Razowski & Pelz, 2007
Sisurcana brasiliana Razowski, 2004
Sisurcana chromotarpa Razowski & Pelz, 2004
Sisurcana cirrhochroma Razowski & Wojtusiak, 2010
Sisurcana citrochyta (Meyrick, 1926)
Sisurcana clavus Razowski & Wojtusiak, 2010
Sisurcana fasciana Razowski & Pelz, 2007
Sisurcana firmuncus Razowski & Pelz, 2007
Sisurcana furcatana Powell, 1986
Sisurcana gnosta Razowski & Wojtusiak, 2011
Sisurcana heredographa Razowski & Pelz, 2004
Sisurcana holographa Razowski & Pelz, 2004
Sisurcana itatiaiae Razowski & Becker, 2011
Sisurcana latiloba Razowski & Wojtusiak, 2010
Sisurcana leprana (Felder & Rogenhofer, 1875)
Sisurcana leptina Razowski, 2004
Sisurcana llaviucana Razowski & Pelz, 2007
Sisurcana margaritae Razowski & Pelz, 2004
Sisurcana microbaccata  Razowski & Wojtusiak, 2009
Sisurcana obscura  Razowski & Wojtusiak, 2008
Sisurcana olivobrunnea  Razowski & Wojtusiak, 2010
Sisurcana paenulata Razowski & Becker, 2004
Sisurcana pallidobrunnea Razowski & Wojtusiak, 2006
Sisurcana papallactana  Razowski & Pelz, 2007
Sisurcana pascoana  Razowski & Wojtusiak, 2010
Sisurcana polychondra Razowski & Becker, 2004
Sisurcana procidua Razowski & Pelz, 2004
Sisurcana pululahuana  Razowski & Wojtusiak, 2009
Sisurcana ranunculata (Meyrick, 1912)
Sisurcana rhora Razowski & Becker, 2004
Sisurcana ruficilia  Razowski & Wojtusiak, 2009
Sisurcana rufograpta  Razowski & Wojtusiak, 2009
Sisurcana sangayana Razowski & Wojtusiak, 2009
Sisurcana sanguinoventer Razowski & Wojtusiak, 2010
Sisurcana sectator Razowski & Becker, 2004
Sisurcana somatina (Dognin, 1912)
Sisurcana spinana Razowski & Pelz, 2007
Sisurcana tabloneana Razowski & Wojtusiak, 2009
Sisurcana temna Razowski & Becker, 2004
Sisurcana topina Razowski & Pelz, 2004
Sisurcana triangulifera Razowski & Pelz, 2007
Sisurcana umbellifera (Meyrick, 1926)
Sisurcana valida Razowski & Becker, 2011
Sisurcana vilcanotae Razowski & Wojtusiak, 2010

See also
List of Tortricidae genera

References

 , 2005: World catalogue of insects volume 5 Tortricidae.
 , 1986, Pan-Pacif. Ent. 62: 382.
 , 2004: Atteriini collected in Brazil, with descriptions of four new species (Lepidoptera: Tortricidae). Shilap Revista de Lepidopterologica 32 (128): 347–353.
 , 2011: Systematic and faunistic data on Neotropical Tortricidae: Phricanthini, Tortricini, Atteriini, Polyorthini, Chlidanotini (Lepidoptera: Tortricidae). Shilap Revista de Lepidopterologia 39 (154): 161–181.
 , 2007, Atteriini from Ecuador (Lepidoptera: Tortricidae), Nachr. entomol. Ver. Apollo N.F. 28 (1/2): 19–33.
 , 2006: Tortricidae from Venezuela (Lepidoptera: Tortricidae). Shilap Revista de Lepidopterologia 34 133): 35-79 
 , 2009: Tortricidae (Lepidoptera) from the mountains of Ecuador and remarks on their geographical distribution. Part IV. Eastern Cordillera. Acta Zoologica Cracoviensia 51B (1-2): 119–187. doi:10.3409/azc.52b_1-2.119-187. Full article: .
 , 2010: Tortricidae (Lepidoptera) from Peru. Acta Zoologica Cracoviensia 53B (1-2): 73-159. . Full article: .
 , 2010: Some Tortricidae from the East Cordillera in Ecuador reared from larvae in Yanayacu Biological Station in Ecuador (Insecta: Lepidoptera). Genus 21 (4): 585–603. Full article: .
 , 2011: Tortricidae (Lepidoptera) from Colombia). Acta Zoologica Cracoviensia 54B (1-2): 103–128. Full article: .

External links
tortricidae.com

 
Atteriini
Tortricidae genera